Savasuddi  is a village in the southern state of Karnataka, India. It is located in the Raybag taluk of Belgaum district in Karnataka.

Demographics
At the 2001 India census, Savasuddi had a population of 5427 with 2769 males and 2658 females.

See also
 Belgaum
 Districts of Karnataka

References

External links
 http://Belgaum.nic.in/

Villages in Belagavi district